Captain Anatoliy  Pavlovich Zotov was a naval attaché to the Soviet Embassy in London who was expelled in December 1982 for conduct unbecoming a diplomat. Specifically, after trying to set up a network of agents to gather information about weapons systems and electronic hardware used by the Royal Navy during the Falklands war.

Zotov and the Soviet air attaché Serge Smirnov, followed by Special Branch, went on a holiday visit to Portsmouth. Dressed in casual clothes and carrying cameras the two joined a pleasure boat which took trippers around the Devonport dockyard to look at warships at anchor. Later, at the Plymouth public library, Zotov requested books on submarines and photocopied an article from the Naval Review (magazine). He told the librarian that he was the Soviet naval attache, and later when he talked to two drinkers at a pub he identified himself in the same way. The two drinkers were later questioned by Special Branch about the conversation, and revealed that Zotov had offered them the opportunity to become Soviet agents. He was expelled from the United Kingdom shortly afterwards.

References

Soviet spies
Soviet Navy personnel
GRU officers
Living people
Soviet expatriates in the United Kingdom
Year of birth missing (living people)
Soviet naval attachés